Todd Michael Williams (born February 13, 1971) is an American former professional baseball relief pitcher. He attended East Syracuse-Minoa High School graduating in 1989. He then attended Onondaga Community College before signing a professional baseball contract with the Los Angeles Dodgers of the Major League Baseball (MLB) in 1991. Over the course of his professional career Williams played for 10 different organizations,
including all or parts of eight seasons in the Major Leagues. He is a retired 18-year professional baseball player, with eight years of Major League Baseball experience. Williams was also a member of the USA Baseball team three separate years, with the highlight of winning a Gold Medal in the 2000 Summer Olympics held in Sydney, Australia.

Williams, who retired from baseball after the 2008 season, holds the all-time Minor League Baseball record for saves with 223, compiled during an 18-year professional career. A four-time Triple-A All-Star Game participant, Williams also holds the record for most career appearances by a professional member of Team USA.

Williams served as bullpen closer for the 2000 United States Olympic Baseball Team during the Sydney, Australia Summer Games. That squad was the lone USA baseball team to win an Olympic gold medal during the span (1988–2008) when baseball was an Olympic medal sport. Williams was a member of the 2001 American League Champion New York Yankees.

Early life
Williams graduated from East Syracuse-Minoa High School in 1989. He was a two-sport athlete
lettering in basketball and baseball. He received all league honors in '88 for baseball and
in '89 was a sectional all-star for the O.H.S.L Champion Spartan baseball team.  A three-year
member of the Varsity Baseball team, recording an E.R.A. of a 2.19 in "87, 2.10 in '88
and 2.13 in '89 while holding a .354 batting average his senior year of '89.

Amateur career
Williams attended Onondaga Community College. In his 1990 season Williams received the
Student–Athlete of the year award and was drafted by the Los Angeles Dodgers in the 54th
round of the 1990 Amateur Draft.

Williams elected to play his 1991 season at Onondaga Community College and was selected to the first team
all-region all-star team as well as sharing the Kelly J Dwyer Award (MVP) with teammate Marc Grande. Williams
finished 8th in the Nation in E.R.A (1.14), and as of '91 was 7th in all-time leaders in E.R.A. (1.76). In
1990 Onondaga ranked 20th in the nation as a team. Onondaga ranked 3rd nationally in hitting with a .369
batting average, finished with the 4th best winning percentage in the country in '90 going 25-3 .893% and in
'91 finished with the 5th best winning percentage in the country going 29–5. Williams then signed with the
Los Angeles Dodgers before the 1991 draft.

Professional career

Los Angeles Dodgers
Williams moved up the Dodgers ladder quickly, making it from short-season Great Falls in 1991 to Triple
A Albuquerque by 1993, and made his big-league debut for the Los Angeles Dodgers on April 29, 1995,
against the Atlanta Braves, retiring all three batters he faced.

Oakland Athletics
He was traded to the Oakland Athletics
four months later, on Sept, 8, 1995, spending the 1996 season at Triple-A Edmonton where he was used in varied
roles, including making 10 of what would be just 12 career starts.

Baltimore Orioles
Over the next eight seasons, Williams would play for six more organizations – Cincinnati Reds (1997–99),
Seattle Mariners (1999–2000), the New York Yankees (2001), Montreal Expos (2002), Tampa Bay Rays
(2003) and Texas Rangers (2004), seeing some big league time with the Reds (six games in 1998), Mariners
(13 games in 1999) and Yankees (15 games in 2001) before signing with the Baltimore Orioles on June 23, 2004.

He would spend the next four years with the Orioles, including all of 2005 and most of 2006 in the big leagues.
After posting a 2.87 ERA in 29 games with the Orioles in 2004, Williams made the club out of spring training in
'05. In 72 games (eighth in the American League), he posted a 3.30 ERA, including his first Major League save,
which came on August 19 in a 5–3 win against the Oakland Athletics.

Williams notched one more save in the majors with the Orioles in 2006 after posting a 4.74 ERA in 62 games. Williams struggled after sustaining an injury in 2007. He went on to post a 7.53 ERA in 14 games. Williams was
subsequently released by the Orioles on June 17 of that year.

Minor League
He finished the '07 season with the
Colorado Rockies organization, pitching at Double-A Tulsa and Triple-A Colorado Springs before becoming a
minor league free agent.

Williams finished his playing career in 2008 with the Long Island Ducks of the Independent Atlantic League
with a 2.68 ERA in 37 games and eight saves, which do not count towards his record-breaking total.

Professional career transactions
 June 4, 1990: Drafted by the Los Angeles Dodgers in the 54th round of the 1990 amateur draft. Player signed May 21, 1991.
 September 8, 1995: Traded by the Los Angeles Dodgers to the Oakland Athletics for Matt McDonald (minors).
 January 16, 1997: Released by the Oakland Athletics.
 February 3, 1997: Signed as a Free Agent with the Cincinnati Reds.
 July 22, 1999: Traded by the Cincinnati Reds to the Seattle Mariners for Kerry Robinson.
 November 16, 2000: Released by the Seattle Mariners.
 January 3, 2001: Signed as a Free Agent with the New York Yankees.
 October 12, 2001: Granted Free Agency.
 December 27, 2001: Signed as a Free Agent with the Los Angeles Dodgers.
 March 26, 2002: Released by the Los Angeles Dodgers.
 May 3, 2002: Signed as a Free Agent with the Montreal Expos.
 October 15, 2002: Granted Free Agency.
 December 23, 2002: Signed as a Free Agent with the Tampa Bay Devil Rays.
 October 15, 2003: Granted Free Agency.
 December 8, 2003: Signed as a Free Agent with the Texas Rangers.
 June 14, 2004: Released by the Texas Rangers.
 June 23, 2004: Signed as a Free Agent with the Baltimore Orioles.
 June 16, 2007: Released by the Baltimore Orioles.
 August 3, 2007: Signed as a Free Agent with the Colorado Rockies.
 October 29, 2007: Granted Free Agency.

Career awards and accomplishments
 East Syracuse –Minoa High School All-League Honors 1988
 ESM O.H.S.L Championship 1989
 ESM Sectional All-Star in 1989
 ESM three year Varsity baseball E.R.A. 1987 (2.19)  1988 (2.10)  1989 (2.13)
 Onondaga Community College Student Athlete of the Year Award 1991
 First team Junior College All –Region All Star team 1991
 Ranked 8th Nationally  in Junior College E.R.A  1991 (1.14)
 Named to the Onondaga Community College Hall of Fame in 2005
 Drafted by the Los Angeles Dodgers 1990
 Los Angeles Dodgers Minor League Pitcher of the Year 1992
 Three time AAA Championships. Albuquerque 1994, Edmonton 1996, Durham 2003
 Inaugural Arizona Fall League Championship Team 1992
 Dominican League Championship 1994. La Romana
 Four time AAA All Star Team 1993, 1998, 1999, 2000
 Rolaids Minor League Relief Pitcher of the Year 1993, 1997, 1998, 2000
 The all- time career Minor League Saves Leader  (223 saves)
 18 years of Professional Baseball experience
 10 Major League organizations: Los Angeles Dodgers, Oakland A's, Cincinnati Reds, Seattle Mariners, N.Y. Yankees, Montreal Expos, Tampa Bay Rays, Texas Rangers, Baltimore Orioles, Colorado Rockies
 Major League debut April 29, 1995 (Los Angeles Dodgers)
 8 Major League Baseball seasons; Los Angeles Dodgers 1995, Cincinnati Reds 1998, Seattle Mariners 1999, A.L. Champion New York Yankees 2001, Baltimore Orioles 2004–2007
 1st Major League Save 2005. (Baltimore Orioles)
 Ranked 8th in the American League in appearances with 72 in 2005
 Led the Baltimore Orioles in appearances in a two-year span (134)  2005–2006
 MLB career totals: 227 games, 12–14 record, 4.33 ERA
 U.S.A. Baseball : Only player to be named to three professional teams for Team USA 1999, 2000, 2003
 U.S.A. Baseball Pan American Games Silver Medalist 1999 (Winnipeg, Canada)
 U.S.A. Baseball Olympic Gold Medalist 2000 (Sydney, Australia)
 U.S.A. Baseball Olympic Qualifying Team 2003 (Panama City, Panama)

Personal life
Since retiring, Williams lives in Tampa, FL, with his
sons Trey and Trevor and daughter Ally-Reese. He has been active in the youth
sports area in both his current community as well as his hometown of Syracuse, NY,
serving as volunteer coach in baseball, basketball and football doing youth-oriented
charity work. He has organized the following:

 AAU Baseball coach
 Little League Baseball coach
 YMCA Basketball coach
 AAU Basketball coach
 Pop Warner Football coach
 Let it Fly flag football tournament coach
 Held clinics for High School Coaches
 Held baseball clinics, Little League, AAU baseball, High School and College
 Work with individuals and teams, teaching fundamentals and mental preparation
 Donates his time to several charities and fundraisers

On December 13, 2007, Williams was one of many athletes mentioned in the detailed Mitchell Report by Senator
George Mitchell.  Kirk Radomski claimed he sold Winstrol to Williams once in 2001. Todd Williams – Page 194 (242).
There was no corroborating evidence mentioned.

See also
 List of Major League Baseball players named in the Mitchell Report

References

External links

1971 births
Living people
Albuquerque Dukes players
American expatriate baseball players in Canada
Bakersfield Dodgers players
Baltimore Orioles players
Baseball players at the 1999 Pan American Games
Baseball players at the 2000 Summer Olympics
Baseball players from Syracuse, New York
Bowie Baysox players
Chattanooga Lookouts players
Cincinnati Reds players
Colorado Springs Sky Sox players
Columbus Clippers players
Durham Bulls players
Edmonton Trappers players
Great Falls Dodgers players
Gulf Coast Yankees players
Indianapolis Indians players
Long Island Ducks players
Los Angeles Dodgers players
Major League Baseball pitchers
Medalists at the 2000 Summer Olympics
New York Yankees players
Norfolk Tides players
Oklahoma RedHawks players
Olympic gold medalists for the United States in baseball
Onondaga Lazers baseball players
Ottawa Lynx players
Pan American Games medalists in baseball
Pan American Games silver medalists for the United States
San Antonio Missions players
Seattle Mariners players
Tacoma Rainiers players
Toros del Este players
American expatriate baseball players in the Dominican Republic
Tulsa Drillers players
Medalists at the 1999 Pan American Games